The Cathedral of St. James in Šibenik, Croatia, is a triple-nave Catholic basilica with three apses and a dome (32 m high inside). It is the episcopal seat of the Šibenik diocese. It is also the most important architectural monument of the Renaissance in the entire country. Since 2000, the cathedral has been on the UNESCO World Heritage List.

It is often known as "St. Jacob's", because Croatian, like many other languages, uses the same name for both "James" and "Jacob". It is dedicated to Saint James the Greater.

Construction

First masters

The building of the church was initiated in 1402, though plans on its construction had already begun in 1298, when Šibenik became a municipality. The actual work to transform the older Romanesque cathedral began in 1431. Built entirely of stone (limestone from a nearby stone quarry and marble from the island of Brač), it was completed in three phases, from 1433 to 1441, when the Grand City Council entrusted the work to local and Italian masters Francesco di Giacomo, Lorenzo Pincino, Pier Paolo Bussato, Bonino da Milano, and Giorgio da Sebenico (Juraj Dalmatinac) and to Croatian ones Andrija Budčić and Grubiš Šlafčić.

Giorgio da Sebenico

Initially, it was conceived as a simple church. In the period between 1441 and 1473 the construction was directed by Giorgio, who was invited to come from Venice as the investors were not satisfied with the beginning of the work. His first contract in 1441 was concluded for a period of 6 years to build just a simple church, but another contract of 10 years followed the first one in 1446. The investors considered that too little for the money spent, so Giorgio altered the plan: he enlarged the cathedral with a side nave and apses, so that the ground plan of the cathedral was in the shape of a cross, and prepared it for the dome, built the presbytery, sanctuary and his masterpiece, the baptistery. With tremendous skill, Giorgio da Sebenico combined architectural and decorative elements to create a unified entity. Giorgio combined several artistic elements in the ground plan: the Lion Gate was inspired by the abbey of San Leonardo di Siponto, the central nave by Trogir cathedral, an eagle over the main entrance as the John the Evangelist's symbol, the San Marco cathedral in Venice as one side nave and the Hagia Sophia in Constantinople as the other side nave. He constructed the western main portal, the northern portal (The Lion Gate) and the first chapel. The western main portal was decorated by Bonino da Milano, first master mason, with statues of Christ and the twelve apostles. The current bronze door was created in 1967 by the Šibenik sculptor Grga Antunac.

The motif of the northern portal, called the Lion Gate, are Adam and Eve standing on two lions, which is also seen at the Trogir Cathedral, but here Adam and Eve are on columns over the lions. These statues, together with St. Jacob and St. Peter, are the work of Juraj Dalmatinac, as he is called in Croatia. The statue of Eve draws the attention of onlookers as she has a belly button, while, according to the Bible, she was conceived from a rib of Adam. The bronze doors were made in 1967 by the Šibenik sculptor Grga Antunac. The coats of arms of two bishops and of the procurator of then-church of St. Saviour in Šibenik were placed over the Lion Gate. 

The two Renaissance putti at the northern end of the cathedral bear an inscription of the consecration in 1443 of the cathedral. Under their feet is his only remaining signature: "Hoc opus cuvarum fecit magister Georgius Matthei Dalmaticus". He also designed the baptistery in the 1440s. He built it next to the southern apse in the form of a quatrefoil. The upper part is covered with lacelike sculptures, the first Renaissance sculptural work in Croatia. The flat niches are vaulted with corrugated seashells of St. James. On the baldachins between them hold two statues: King David and the prophet Simon. The vault ribs end in the keystone representing the Father God, surrounded by angels and the dove (symbol of the Holy Ghost). The baptismal font, made from reddish breccias, is supported by three angels.

The apses are decorated on the outside with various sculptural decorations, including 74 small Renaissance portraits immortalising important contemporaries and figures who had for some reason particularly impressed the architect or that he deemed to tight to help foot the bill for the cathedral's construction. Some of these heads on the facade have a damaged nose, probably due to vandalism. Indeed, until Justinian II this was the expression to discredit the reputation of someone, and so it was necessary that this individual remained anonymous.

Giorgio worked probably on the cathedral up to his death in 1475 and certainly until 1473.

Niccolò di Giovanni Fiorentino

Between 1475 and 1505 the work was overseen by Tuscan master Niccolò di Giovanni Fiorentino (Nicola Firentinac), from the Donatello school of sculpture who developed as a sculptor and builder in Dalmatia. He continued the building in the Tuscan Renaissance style, completing the extensive galleries, building the vault in the central nave, the outer sculptures of St. Michael, St. James and St. Mark. The barrel roof is made from a line of enormous stone slabs and considered a marvel of construction at the time, and the upper façade. He also built the triforias (parallel galleries) and worked on the presbytery and sanctuary.

Although the dome of Šibenik Cathedral was built after the dome in Florence, Niccolò di Giovanni Fiorentino used an octagonal drum in its construction, before Bramante and Michelangelo, in its original function as the transition from the square base to the circular dome. The execution of the cupola is considered one of the best achievements of Renaissance architecture.

Inside the cathedral
Inside the cathedral there are four large, evenly matched columns on which the dome rests. The builder decorated the capitals and came to arrangements with the nobles who were to finance the building of chapels, on condition that they would be free to choose their own builders. In the first chapel on the right-side, there is the sarcophagus of the bishop, humanist and writer Juraj Šižgorić (1420–1509) which is the work of Andrija Aleši based on a design by Juraj Dalmatinac. Aleši also created the statue of St. Elijah which stands behind the bishop's throne. On the left-hand side is the sarcophagus of Bishop Ivan Štafilič, during whose life the cathedral was completed. Beneath the choir there are the graves of two bishops, with reliefs: on the right Bishop Calegari and on the left, Bishop Spingarola. The latter is the work of the local artist Antun Nogulovič.

Opposite the famous Altar of the Holy Cross (Sveti Križ) made by Juraj Čulinovič (Giorgio Schiavone) is buried (1433 or 1446–1505). On the altar there is a painting by Felipe Zaniberti. Amongst other altars to the left of the entrance is the Altar of the Holy Three Kings with a painting by Bernardo Rizzardi, according to the ground plan of Juraj Dalmatinac (see above). The fragments of the mosaic of the Holy Three Kings in St. Mark's Basilica in Venice are now in the Museo Marciano in Venice. The sides of the altar are decorated with reliefs of two angels holding the scroll of Nikola Firentinac, set into shell-shaped niches. The cathedral treasury includes works by the Renaissance master Horacije Fortezza of Šibenik (1530–1596), an exceptional goldsmith and miniaturist.

After Fiorentino died in 1505, the construction was finally completed in 1535 by two other craftsmen, Bartolmeo of Mestra and his son Jacob, completely following Nicholas' instructions. The cathedral officially became consecrated in 1555 after a multitude of Venetian and local craftsmen had worked on it, in Gothic style.

Subsequent work 

As Šibenik Cathedral has no bell-tower, a tower on the adjoining city walls served this purpose until its demolition at the end of 19th century.

Most of the restoration was done between 1850 and 1860. and subsequently between 1992 and 1997.

The dome of the church was heavily damaged by the JNA-supported Serb forces during the shelling of Šibenik in September 1991. Within years it was quickly repaired with no damage visible.

In popular culture 
Since the interior of the cathedral was extensively 3D recorded for documentation and restoration purposes, its 3D model is often used for graphic and especially video modelling purposes.
The cathedral served as a backdrop for the Iron Bank in the ninth episode of the fifth season of Game of Thrones. Šibenik portrayed Braavos, the city where the Iron Bank is located.

Gallery

References

External links

 Cathedral of St. James in Šibenik at UNESCO web site
 Explore the Cathedral of St. James in Šibenik in the UNESCO collection on Google Arts and Culture
 Cathedral of St. James at Šibenik web site
 Cathedral of St. James at Sibenik Region Tourist Board

World Heritage Sites in Croatia
Šibenik
Croatian art
Basilica churches in Croatia
Tourist attractions in Šibenik-Knin County
Church buildings with domes
Articles containing video clips
Roman Catholic cathedrals in Croatia
Buildings and structures in Šibenik-Knin County
History of Šibenik